Veendum Prabhatham (Morning Again) is a 1973 Indian Malayalam-language film, directed by P. Bhaskaran and produced by M. P. Rao and M. R. K. Moorthy. The film stars Prem Nazir, Vijayasree, Sharada, Jose Prakash and Prema. It was released on 27 April 1973 and became a success.

Plot 

Gopalan Nair works in a factory and struggles to bring up his children. However, an accident in the factory makes him blind. Afraid of being a burden on his young children, he leaves them. Will his 10-year-old daughter Lakshmi and her brothers find their father?

Cast 

Prem Nazir as Ravi
Sharada as Lakshmi (dubbed by KPAC Lalitha)
Vijayasree as Sarojam
Adoor Bhasi as Sasi
Jose Prakash as Madhu
Radhamani as Latha
Sankaradi as Sarigama Kurup
Veeran as Prabhakara Kaimal
T. S. Muthaiah as Gopalan Nair
Bahadoor as Vikraman
Prema as Mariyamma
Baby Shobha as Young Lakshmi
Baby Sumathi as Young Ravi
C. A. Balan as Pathros Muthalali
Paul Vengola as Lonachan
Ramankutty Menon as Kaimal's Servant
Thodupuzha Radhakrishnan as Supervisor
Abbas as Drama Proprietor
Vanchiyoor Radha as Parvathi
Master Vijaykumar as Young Madhu

Soundtrack 
The music was composed by V. Dakshinamoorthy.

References

External links 
 

1970s Malayalam-language films
1973 films
Films directed by P. Bhaskaran
Films scored by V. Dakshinamoorthy